This article lists the presidents of the Senate of France (official translation: Speaker of the Senate) and assimilated chambers.

The Senate is the upper house of the French Parliament. It is presided over by a president. Although there had been Senates in both the First and Second Empires, these had not technically been legislative bodies, but rather advisory bodies on the model of the Roman Senate. France's first experience with an upper house was under the Directory from 1795 to 1799, when the Council of Ancients was the upper chamber. With the Restoration in 1814, a new Chamber of Peers was created, on the model of the British House of Lords. At first it contained hereditary peers, but following the July Revolution of 1830, it became a body to which one was appointed for life. The Second Republic returned to a unicameral system after 1848, but soon after the establishment of the Second Empire in 1852, a Senate was established as the upper chamber. In the Fourth Republic, the Senate was renamed the Council of the Republic, but its function was largely the same. With the new constitution of the Fifth Republic in 1959, the older name of Senate was restored.

Acting President of the French Republic
The president of the Senate, in addition to his duties as presiding officer of the upper house of parliament, is also, according to the Constitution of the Fifth Republic, first in line of succession in case of death, resignation, or removal by impeachment of the president, thus becoming Acting President of the Republic until a new election can be held. This has already occurred twice. Alain Poher, the president of the French Senate, served as Acting President of France from 28 April until 20 June 1969 (between the resignation of President Charles de Gaulle and the installation of his elected successor President Georges Pompidou) and again from 3 April until 27 May 1974 (between the death of President Georges Pompidou and the installation of his elected successor President Valéry Giscard d'Estaing).

List of officeholders

Under the Directory (1795–1799)

Presidents of the Council of Ancients:

Under the Consulate (1799–1804)

Presidents of the Sénat conservateur:

Under the First Empire (1804–1814)

Presidents of the Sénat conservateur:

Under the Bourbon Restoration (1814–1830)

Presidents of the Chamber of Peers:

Under the July Monarchy (1830–1848)

Presidents of the Chamber of Peers:

Under the Second Empire (1852–1870)

Presidents of the Senate:

Under the Third Republic (1870–1940)

Presidents of the Senate:

Under the Fourth Republic (1946–1958)

Presidents of the Council of the Republic:

Political party

Under the Fifth Republic (1958–present)

Presidents of the Senate:

Political party

See also
 Senate (France)
 Council of Ancients (France)
 Council of the Republic (France)
 Chamber of Peers (France)

References

 
France, Senate, President
France politics-related lists